Sugarless was a Spanish hard rock band, active from 1995 to 2006. In January 2020, they announced their return, which did not occur.

History 

After Asegúramelo, their next project was Más Gas (2002), by Zero Records, produced/mixed by Dani Alcover (Dover) and co-produced by Frankie, a job that made them known on the national rock scene, achieving up to 5000 sales.

In 2003, their final studio album, Vertigo, was released, produced and mixed by Frankie himself under the Zero Records label. In it, they underwent a small evolution in their style, losing a large part of their influences, increasing the prominence of Frankie's bass and melodic guitar and replacing a large part of the heavy and aggressive riffs of previous installments.

Discography 

 Asegúramelo (Mans Records, 1998)
 Más Gas (Zero Records, 2002)
 Vértigo (Zero Records, 2003)

Music videos 

 "Abre tu sonrisa", 2002
 "Guantánamo", 2003

Singles 

 "Miedo", 2002
 "Guantánamo", 2003

Members 

 Última formación

 Sammy - lead vocals 
 Joseba - bass 
 Frankie - electric guitar 
 Samuel - drums 

 Antiguos miembros

 Ivahn - backing vocals 
 David Obelleiro - electric guitar 
 Edu Ostos - drums

External links 

 Sugarless en IndyRock
 Entrevista a Sugarless
 Sugarless en Lastfm
 Sugarless en La Factoría del Ritmo
 Comentario del Álbum Vértigo en Zona-Zero.net
 Sugarless en All Music
 Entrevista a Sugarless en Mondosonoro, 1999
 Entrevista a Sugarless en Mondosonoro, 2004
 Entrevista a Sugarless en Todaslasnovedades.net

References 

Spanish rock music groups
Spanish heavy metal musical groups
Spanish hard rock musical groups
Spanish funk musical groups
Spanish hardcore punk groups
Spanish punk rock groups
Spanish hip hop groups
Nu metal musical groups
Funk metal musical groups
Rapcore groups
Grunge musical groups
Rap rock groups
Rap metal musical groups